Wolaita Sodo City Football Club (Amharic: ወላይታ ሶዶ ከተማ እግር ኳስ ክለብ) or in short Sodo City Football Club is an Ethiopian football club based in Wolaita Sodo. Wolaita Sodo City F.C. was officially established in 2011. The club is a member of the Ethiopian Football Federation and plays in the Ethiopian Higher League, the second order professional football competition in Ethiopia. Sodo City F.c. is one of the leading clubs in Wolayita Zone, which is known for recruiting young football players.

History
In 2021/22 season the club board solved the financial problems in the club, which created the survival of the club in the league in question. They worked in adjusting the goal to transforming re-recruiting new players from youth project. After the problem solved the team has battled in the second round, and this helped the club to survive in the Ethiopian Higher League.

Stadium 
Wolaita Sodo City Football club Uses Sodo Stadium which is located in Wolaita Sodo, Ethiopia for its home matches.

References

Football clubs in Ethiopia
Wolayita
Sport in Wolayita Zone
Sport in the Southern Nations, Nationalities, and Peoples' Region